Maria Victoria Sy-Alvarado ( Reyes; born March 23, 1957) is a Filipino politician. A member of the Lakas-CMD Party, she served as a Member of the House of Representatives of the Philippines, representing the First District of Bulacan from 2007 to 2016.

She is the wife of her predecessor in Congress, Wilhelmino Sy-Alvarado, who served as the Vice Governor of Bulacan from 2019 to 2022. Despite her successful reelection bid in 2010 over former Governor Roberto Pagdanganan, her seat in the Congress is in vacancy due to the deferring of the election made by the  election for the new Malolos City representation.

Malolos was ruled by the Supreme Court unconstitutional, saying it violated Article VI Section 5 (3) of the Constitution and Section 3 of the Ordinance attached to constitution; Malolos was ruled not to have exceeded the 250,000 population for a separate legislative district. A special election was held on November 13, 2010, and she was successful in her race.

She served until 2016 and was succeeded by her son, Jose Antonio Sy-Alvarado.

References

 

People from Bulacan
1957 births
Members of the House of Representatives of the Philippines from Bulacan
Women members of the House of Representatives of the Philippines
Living people
Lakas–CMD (1991) politicians
Lakas–CMD politicians
National Unity Party (Philippines) politicians